Samuel Reinaldo Moncada Acosta (born 13 June 1959) is a Venezuelan politician and diplomat currently serving as Permanent Representative of Venezuela to the United Nations since 2017 and formerly served as Alternate Representative of Venezuela to the Organization of American States from 2017 to 2019. He was Venezuela's deputy foreign minister until June 2017, when he succeeded Delcy Rodriguez as Venezuela's Foreign Minister. On August 2, 2017, following the 2017 Venezuelan Constituent Assembly election, President Nicolás Maduro appointed former Vice President Jorge Arreaza to replace Moncada as the new Foreign Affairs Minister.

Biography 
Moncada graduated in history at the Central University of Venezuela.

Between 2004 and 2006, he was Minister of Higher Education of President Hugo Chavez and director of the History School of the Central University of Venezuela. Moncada was Ambassador of Venezuela to the United Nations in 2013. He also  was Venezuela's ambassador to the United Kingdom of Great Britain and Northern Ireland.

Later, he served as Ambassador of Venezuela to the Organization of American States (OAS) and as head of the Presidential Commission of the Non-Aligned Movement.

Moncada assumed the Vice-Ministry for North America, and then replaced Delcy Rodríguez as Foreign Affairs Minister during the 2017 Constituent Assembly election. After the elections were over, President Nicolás Maduro appointed former Vice President Jorge Arreaza as his successor, for which Moncada returned to exercise his functions as Vice Minister and Ambassador of Venezuela to the OAS.

In 2017 Maduro also appointed Moncada as Venezuela's Permanent Representative to the United Nations.

Ambassador to OAS 
In January 2019 (during the 2019 Venezuelan presidential crisis), the National Assembly of Venezuela appointed Gustavo Tarre Briceño as representative to the OAS, an international organization which does not recognize Nicolás Maduro as president. On April 9, 2019, the OAS voted 18 to 9, with six abstentions, to accept Tarre as the ambassador from Venezuela until new presidential elections can be held. 

The permanent council approved text saying "Nicolas Maduro's presidential authority lacks legitimacy and his designations for government posts, therefore, lack the necessary legitimacy." Antigua and Barbuda, Bolivia, Dominica, Grenada, Mexico, Saint Vincent and the Grenadines, Suriname, Uruguay and Venezuela voted against the change. Maduro's administration responded calling Tarre a "political usurper". According to The Washington Post, this acceptance undermines Maduro's presence internationally and marks a step in the official recognition of Guaidó's government. Voice of America called it an "historic vote". 

Tarre's appointment encouraged similar actions against the Maduro government by other international bodies. On April 10, 2019 the International Monetary Fund cut off Venezuelan access until a majority of its members recognized a Maduro or Guaidó representative, and the United States Vice President Mike Pence requested that the United Nations replace ongoing ambassador Samuel Moncada with a Guaidó-aligned one.

See also
List of Ministers of Foreign Affairs of Venezuela
List of foreign ministers in 2017

References

External links

 

1959 births
Living people
20th-century Venezuelan historians
21st-century Venezuelan historians
Venezuelan Ministers of Foreign Affairs
People of the Crisis in Venezuela
Central University of Venezuela alumni
Permanent Representatives of Venezuela to the United Nations